Acharya Radhika Prasad Goswamy, known as Sangeet Nayak, was an Indian vocalist in the Hindustani classical tradition, based in the Bishnupur Gharana. 

A renowned exponent of the Bishnupur Gharana, he was known for the Khayal, Dhrupad, Thumri and Tappa, along with Raga-pradhan songs. From Bengal, Radhika was the uncle of Pandit Jnanendra Prasad Goswamy.

Early life 
Radhika's journey to the world of Indian Classical Music was initiated at his home under the guidance of his elder brother Pandit Bipin Chandra Goswamy, who was a noted Esraj player.

His acquaintance were eminent vocalists such as Pandit Girija Shankar Chakrabarty and Ustad Faiyaz Khan. He received his music training from musicians of Betiya gharana of Bihar, as did other contemporary singers of the Bishnupur gharana.

Professional career
For sometime after shifted from Bishnupur to Kolkata, Radhika Prasad Goswami used to live in the house of Raja Manindra Chandra Nandi at Kashimbazar, mentioned by Sri Jayanta Kumar Ghosh.

Death
A Dhrupad composition notated by Radhika Prasad in the uncommon Raga Hem Khem appeared posthumously in the July 1925 issue of the magazine Sangeet Biggnan Probeshika. The article accompanying his obituary also mentions that shortly before his death he was awarded the second prize in the All India Music Conference at Lucknow, the first prize being given to Alla Bande Khan.

Legacy
Radhika's nephew and disciple Pandit Jnanendra Prasad Goswamy along with many others carried out his legacy and teachings.

References 

1852 births
1925 deaths
Hindustani singers
Indian classical musicians of Bengal
Singers from West Bengal